Corby Farm Complex is a historic farm complex located near Honeoye Falls in Livingston County, New York. The complex consists of the farmhouse and the following contributing structures: garage, smokehouse, pump house, clothes drying pole, privy, barn, two silos, and gate posts. The farmhouse consists of a -story main block with -story kitchen wing, built in the mid-19th century and remodeled in 1877 and again about 1900.

It was listed on the National Register of Historic Places in 2008.

References

Farms on the National Register of Historic Places in New York (state)
Federal architecture in New York (state)
Italianate architecture in New York (state)
Buildings and structures in Livingston County, New York
National Register of Historic Places in Livingston County, New York